Sylvia Maria Kristel (28 September 1952 17 October 2012) was a Dutch actress and model who appeared in over 50 films. She is best remembered as the eponymous character in five of the seven Emmanuelle films, including originating the role with Emmanuelle (1974).

Early life
Kristel was born in Utrecht, the Netherlands; she was the elder daughter of an innkeeper, Jean-Nicholas Kristel, and his wife Pietje Hendrika Lamme. In her 2006 autobiography, Nue, she stated that she was sexually abused by an elderly hotel guest when she was nine years old, an experience she otherwise refused to discuss. Her parents divorced when she was 14 years old, after her father abandoned the family for another woman. "It was the saddest thing that ever happened to me," she said of the experience of her parents' separation.

Career

Kristel began modeling when she was 17 years old. In 1971, before becoming famous, she took part in an audition for the female lead in the film Last Tango in Paris (1972) but lost out to Maria Schneider. In 1973, she won the Miss TV Europe contest. She spoke Dutch, English, German, and Italian fluently, as well as several other languages to a lesser extent. Kristel gained international attention in 1974 for playing the title character in the softcore film Emmanuelle, which remains one of the most successful French films ever produced.

After the success of Emmanuelle, she often played roles that capitalized on that sexually provocative image, starring in an adaptation of Lady Chatterley's Lover (1981), and a nudity-filled biographical film of the World War I spy in Mata Hari (1985).

During the 1970s, she worked on lesser known films by prominent French directors including Claude Chabrol and Roger Vadim. She also starred next to Joe Dallesandro in Walerian Borowczyk's La Marge (1976), a success at the French box office.

She was cast to play the part of Stella in Roman Polanski's film The Tenant (1976) but, after one day of shooting, she was replaced by Isabelle Adjani. In 1977, she was invited to star as Hattie in Louis Malle's controversial erotic drama Pretty Baby (1978) but the role eventually went to Susan Sarandon instead. She was friends with Sergio Leone who wanted her to play the role of Carol in the movie Once Upon a Time in America (1984); the producers did not agree to her participation and the role went to Tuesday Weld. In 1982, she was turned down by Tony Scott for the role of Miriam in The Hunger (1983); Catherine Deneuve ended up playing the part. She was considered for the role of Lois Lane in Superman (1978), which went to Margot Kidder. Sylvia unsuccessfully applied for the role of a Bond Girl in the movies: The Spy Who Loved Me (1977), Moonraker (1979), For Your Eyes Only (1981) and Octopussy (1983).

She rejected the main female roles in The Story of Adele H. (1975), King Kong (1976), Logan's Run (1976), Caligula (1979), Body Heat (1981), Blade Runner (1982), Scarface (1983), Dune (1984), Body Double (1984) and Blue Velvet (1986).

Her Emmanuelle typecasting image followed her to the United States, where she played Nicole Mallow, a maid who seduces a teenaged boy in the sex comedy Private Lessons (1981). Another mainstream American film appearance was a brief comic turn in the Get Smart revival film The Nude Bomb in 1980.

Although Private Lessons was one of the highest-grossing independent films of 1981 (ranking number 28 in US domestic gross), Kristel reportedly saw none of the profits and continued to appear in movies and last played Emmanuelle in the early 1990s. In May 1990, she appeared in the television series My Riviera, filmed at her home in Saint-Tropez and offering insights of her life and motivations in an interview with writer-director Michael Feeney Callan. Her friend, Gérard Depardieu, wanted to secure her comeback and unsuccessfully tried to persuade the producers of 1492: Conquest of Paradise to cast her as Queen Isabel. In 2001, she played a small role in Forgive Me, Dutch filmmaker Cyrus Frisch's debut. In May 2006, Kristel received an award at the Tribeca Film Festival, New York, for directing the animated short film Topor and Me, written by Ruud Den Dryver. The award was presented by Gayle King.

After a hiatus of eight years, she appeared in the film Two Sunny Days (2010), and that same year, in her last acting role, she played Eva de Leeuw in the Italian TV film The Swing Girls.

In June 2021 it was announced that actress Sylvia Hoeks will play Sylvia Kristel in a biopic about the life and career of Kristel.

Personal life

In September 2006, Kristel's autobiography Nue (Nude) was published in France. The writing was translated into English as Undressing Emmanuelle: A Memoir, by Fourth Estate, 2 July 2007, in which she described a turbulent personal life that was blighted by addictions to drugs and alcohol, and her quest for a father figure, which resulted in some destructive relationships with older men. The book received some positive reviews.

She had her first major relationship with Belgian author Hugo Claus, who was more than two decades her senior. Their union produced her only child, a son named Arthur, who was born in 1975. She left her husband for British actor Ian McShane, whom she had met on the set of the film The Fifth Musketeer (1979). They moved in together in Los Angeles, where he had promised to help launch her American career. However, their five-year affair led to no significant career break for Kristel, but a relationship she describes in her autobiography as "awful he was witty and charming, but we were too much alike." She began using cocaine about two years into their relationship. This proved her downfall, although at the time she thought of it as a "supervitamin, a very fashionable substance, without danger, but expensive, far more exciting than drowning in alcohol a fuel necessary to stay in the swing." Sylvia Kristel also had a relationship with French singer Michel Polnareff.

Kristel was interviewed in 2006 for the documentary Hunting Emmanuelle. She described how she made a number of poor decisions due to an expensive cocaine addiction. One of those mistakes included selling her interest in Private Lessons to her agent for US$150,000; the film grossed more than US$26 million domestically. After McShane, she married twice, first to Alan Turner, an American businessman. That marriage ended after five months, and she later married film producer Philippe Blot. She spent a decade with Belgian radio producer Fred De Vree, until his death in 2004.

Her authorized biography was written by Dutch journalist Suzanne Rethans and was published in September 2019. It took Rethans more than three years to write it. Titled 'Begeerd en Verguisd' - Atlas Contact -  ('Desired and Vilified'), it has not yet been translated into English.

Illness and death
Kristel was a heavy cigarette smoker from the age of 11. She was diagnosed with throat cancer in 2001, and underwent three courses of chemotherapy and surgery after the disease spread to her lungs. On 12 June 2012, she suffered a stroke and was hospitalized in critical condition. Four months later, she died in her sleep at age 60 from esophageal and lung cancer. Kristel is buried at her place of birth in Utrecht, the Netherlands.

Filmography

Film

Television

References

External links

 
 
 
 

1952 births
2012 deaths
20th-century Dutch actresses
20th-century Dutch women writers
21st-century Dutch actresses
21st-century Dutch women writers
Dutch autobiographers
Dutch female models
Dutch women singers
Dutch film actresses
Dutch television actresses
Dutch biographers
Deaths from esophageal cancer
Deaths from lung cancer
Deaths from cancer in the Netherlands
Actors from Utrecht (city)
Women autobiographers
Women biographers